Quinolacetic acid is a metabolite associated with Hawkinsinuria.

Notes
Hawkinsinuria--identification of quinolacetic acid and pyroglutamic acid during an acidotic phase

Acetic acids
Beta hydroxy acids
Ketones